Aqua Teen Forever: Plantasm is a 2022 American direct-to-video adult animated surreal black comedy film based on the Adult Swim animated series Aqua Teen Hunger Force, and a stand-alone sequel to the 2007 film Aqua Teen Hunger Force Colon Movie Film for Theaters. The film was produced, written, and directed by series creators Matt Maiellaro and Dave Willis, and features the voices of Dana Snyder, Carey Means, Willis, Maiellaro, Peter Serafinowicz, Paul Walter Hauser, Natasha Rothwell, Robert Smigel, Tim Robinson and Jo Firestone. The film centers around the Aqua Teens reunited as they come into conflict with an evil tech mogul named Neil, who runs the mega-corporation Amazin.

The film is the first of Adult Swim's line of straight-to-video movies, and was released by Warner Bros. Home Entertainment on Blu-ray, 4K Ultra HD, and digital on November 8, 2022, and was made available on HBO Max on February 8, 2023. The film aired on Adult Swim on March 12, 2023.

Plot
Several years ago, Frylock moved out of the Aqua Teen house in frustration. Some time later, Meatwad and Master Shake also had to leave and are now separated and homeless. 

Frylock works at the IT department of megacompany Amazin, which is led by reclusive and diminutive owner Neil from his llama-shaped skyscraper Llama Dolly, rumored to be a functioning spaceship. One day Frylock is summoned to Neil, who explains that he wishes to become taller. He has a scientist assistant, Elmer, who had no success in that regard and who is shown (seemingly also without success) working on creating plants with humanlike intelligence. Neil requests Frylock to repair one of Elmer's stretching machines, but Frylock suggests DNA splicing to clone a larger version of Neil, who enthusiastically agrees.

Later that night, Frylock is attacked by muggers and badly mutilated, before he is rescued by Neil and Elmer. Since Frylock's old shell is destroyed in the attack, he is given a new metal shell by Neil and Elmer, who admire the crystal that is attached to Frylock and powers him. During his reconvalescence, it seems that a friendship develops between him and Neil.

After several failed experiments, Frylock is able to splice the DNA of a giraffe and former basketball player Shawn Kemp into Neil's, which creates an extremely tall clone. The clone calls himself Big Neil and immediately usurps Neil's position, locking him inside a wooden box. 

Master Shake and Meatwad arrive in short succession at former neighbor Carl's house, asking to crash with him. Carl only lets them stay in his backyard. 

Amazin has sent out scores of packages to addresses all over the United States. When Carl had tried to steal the packages that arrived in his neighborhood, he noticed that most of them are completely empty. Meatwad and Shake use the empty boxes to build provisional homes in Carl's backyard. When Carl's sprinkler turns on and soaks the boxes, they turn into animal-like plant creatures which attack and almost kill Shake, Meatwad and Carl. They are able to contact Frylock when they learn that he works at Amazin and try to warn him, but he is unwilling to hear their story. When Frylock returns to Amazin, Big Neil and Elmer fire all workers, two alien races called the Japongaloids and the Fraptaculans, who Neil had enslaved using the Llama Dolly, which is revealed to actually be a powerful spaceship. 

Big Neil and Elmer plan to replace the aliens by the plant creatures Elmer has finally successfully developed by synthesizing Frylock's crystal. Neil comments that he only got close to Frylock to obtain access to his crystal and that all Amazin packaging consists solely of seeds, which develop into the creatures when they are watered. When a storm creates the plant creatures all over the land and they seem to overwhelm the humans, Big Neil fires Elmer and wants to kill the creatures with pesticide. Elmer consumes plant seeds and drinks some water to transform into a giant treelike human/plant hybrid, takes control of the plant creatures and attacks Big Neil and Neil, who flee in Llama Dolly. 

Frylock rushes to Shake and Meatwad and helps them defend themselves from the plant creatures. When they are about to be overwhelmed, Carl arrives with his car and takes them in. They flee to Used Babywipe Mountain, the only place in New Jersey above the tree line, where they are safe from the plant creatures. Llama Dolly also arrives there and Frylock and the two Neils hatch a plan to exterminate the plant creatures: they will fly Llama Dolly to the Moon and push it in front of the Sun, which will deprive the plant creatures of sunlight and kill them. On the Moon their ship is attacked by the Mooninites' ship. When it is about to lose the fight, Fylock frees Neil from his box because he is the only one able to fully operate the ship. They defeat the Mooninites and push the Moon in front of the Sun. 

While this is happening, Carl, Shake and Meatwad create a Mad-Max-like monster car and attack the plant creatures with it. After some initial successes they are about to get overwhelmed, when the Japongaloids and the Fraptaculans join the battle, evening the odds. When the moon is finally pushed in front of the sun, all plant creatures, including Elmer, die, but the Earth starts to freeze over. 

When the Neils return to Earth, they are immediately brutally killed by the Japongaloids and the Fraptaculans, who then ask themselves what to eat now that the Earth is freezing over. Carl mentions that the Aqua Teens are made of food, which leads to the Japongaloids and the Fraptaculans devouring them.

In a post-credits scene, a dying Master Shake is bitten by Markula, turning him into a vampire bat and screaming, "I smell a sequel!"

Cast

 Dana Snyder as Master Shake
 Carey Means as Frylock
 Dave Willis as Meatwad, Carl and Ignignokt
 Matt Maiellaro as Err and Markula
 Peter Serafinowicz as Neil and Big Neil
 Paul Walter Hauser as Elmer
 Natasha Rothwell as Japongaloid (Japongaloid Natasha)
 Robert Smigel as Fraptaculan (Fraptaculan Robert)
 Tim Robinson as Fraptaculan (Fraptaculan Tim)
 Kyle Kinane as Elric in IT
 Jo Firestone as Felicity in IT
 Lauren Holt as Liz
 Comedian CP as Stretch Instructor and Japongaloid (Japongaloid Chris)
 Blair Socci as Japongaloid (Japongaloid Blair)
 Shawn Kemp as himself
 Lavell Crawford as Street Tough
 John Wilson as Amazin' Board Member
 Jaime Meline as Street Tough
 Killer Mike as Boxy Brown

Production

Development
There has been talk of producing a sequel to Colon Movie Film for Theaters titled Death Fighter. While little has been confirmed by Adult Swim in regards to the film, there have been many statements regarding it. On December 15, 2008, Willis stated no script was written and that the film would be released in Spring 2009 (though, as he also stated that Death Fighter was a T-shirt he was working on, he likely wasn't being serious). Following this, in an April 2009 interview, Willis joked about the film lacking any sort of funding and being sold out of the back of his car.

In a 2010 interview, Radical Axis staff stated Death Fighter was in production, and mentioned the possibility that the film might be made in 3-D. When asked if the film was designed for a theatrical release, a Radical Axis staff member responded yes, but stated: "We're not sure if we have a distributor yet", though this was then followed by the statement that "Adult Swim will never make another movie ever again".

Progress
In 2014, Willis claimed that the script had been completed & approved and that the film would be released sometime in mid-2015, then jokingly stated that the film was shelved as it was not G-rated; however, on April 25, 2015, at a C2CE convention panel, Willis indirectly stated that the project was scrapped, soon after announcing the series' cancellation. He later mentioned on Reddit that it would need a $3.4 million budget, and expressed interest in funding via Kickstarter. He reportedly stated that release could happen within the next two years.

Plantasm
A new film was confirmed to be in production in May 2021, with no further details confirmed aside from it being direct-to-video.

On May 12, 2021, Adult Swim confirmed the production of three new original films, including a new Aqua Teen Hunger Force film to make exclusive debuts on HBO Max following a physical/VOD release. On November 14, 2021, it was announced the film would be released in 2022.

On May 18, 2022, the title was revealed as Aqua Teen Hunger Force: Plantasm.

in August 2022 the title was changed to Aqua Teen Forever: Plantasm.

Release
A sneak preview was shown at Adult Swim Festival in August 2022, and the film was confirmed to be released on Blu-ray, 4K Ultra HD and digital on November 8, 2022.

The film made its streaming premiere on HBO Max on February 8, 2023, and premiered on Adult Swim on March 12, 2023.

Reception
On the review aggregator site Rotten Tomatoes, the film holds a 100% rating, based on reviews from 5 critics.

References

External links 

2022 films
2022 animated films
2020s American animated films
2020s monster movies
Adult animated comedy films
American adult animated films
American flash animated films
American computer-animated films
American black comedy films
2020s English-language films
Aqua Teen Hunger Force films
American monster movies
Adult Swim films
Warner Bros. direct-to-video animated films
Animated films based on animated series
Films based on television series
Surreal comedy films
2022 black comedy films
Films about food and drink